Richard Plant (July 22, 1910 – March 10, 1998) was a gay Jewish emigre from Nazi Germany, first to Switzerland and then to the U.S., who became a professor at the City University of New York, where he taught German language and literature from 1947 to 1973. He authored an opera scenario as well a number of fictional and non-fictional works, notably The Pink Triangle: The Nazi War Against Homosexuals (1986).

The early years in Frankfurt (1910–1933)

Richard Plant was born Richard Plaut in Frankfurt am Main to Meta and Theodor Plaut, a practicing physician who served for many years as a Social Democratic city council alderman. While his parents were religiously non-observant and largely assimilated, his paternal grandfather, Dr. Rudolf Plaut, was a Reform rabbi. Despite his parents' secular outlook, he was briefly involved as a 16-year-old with Kadimah, a Zionist youth organization, where he experienced his first sexual encounters. His godfather was Kurt Goldstein, a professor of neurology at the recently founded University of Frankfurt, which had a reputation as Germany's most left-wing university and also had the highest percentage of Jewish students and professors of any German university. 
Goldstein, a Gestalt therapist, helped the youngster manage his stuttering to a large extent and also counseled his parents to accept his sexual orientation.

Following his secondary schooling at Frankfurt's noted Goethe Gymnasium, Plaut enrolled in 1929 at the University of Frankfurt, where he studied German literature and European history. In a seminar on baroque literature taught by Martin Sommerfeld, he made the acquaintance of Oskar Koplowitz, beginning a friendship they maintained when they later emigrated from Germany to Switzerland and the U.S. He attended courses taught by the philosopher and Protestant theologian Paul Tillich and through him became acquainted with the sociologists Theodor Adorno and Norbert Elias. Literature, theater, and the cinema were his primary interests, and his earliest publications, film reviews edited by Siegfried Kracauer, appeared in the left-liberal daily Frankfurter Rundschau. He also appeared on stage as an extra in Schauspielhaus productions of plays by Fritz von Unruh and Carl Zuckmayer. In the fall of 1930, Plaut briefly transferred to the University of Berlin, where in addition to continuing his studies for one semester he wrote cultural commentaries for various newspapers and worked as an extra in UFA films, including The Threepenny Opera. In Berlin he was introduced to Klaus Mann, whose openly gay novel Der fromme Tanz (1925) he greatly admired. Returning to the University of Frankfurt in 1931, he remained active as a journalist and theater extra at a time when courses taught by Jewish professors, including Sommerfeld, were increasingly disrupted by the growing Nazi Students League. Plant hoped to write a doctoral dissertation on the formula novelist Hedwig Courths-Mahler, but when Sommerfeld rejected this thesis proposal, he decided to transfer again, this time to Basel.

Studies in Switzerland (1933–1938)
On February 28, 1933, coincidentally the day following the Reichstag fire, Plaut departed by train for Switzerland, where he was joined a few months later by Koplowitz. They initially regarded the move as a temporary transfer, not a permanent emigration, and expected to return to Frankfurt once the Nazis were turned out of office. While Plaut and Koplowitz enrolled at the University of Basel in 1933, Koplowitz's partner Dieter Cunz, a gentile, initially remained in Frankfurt but after completing his Ph.D. in 1934 also relocated to Switzerland. Hard pressed financially and constrained in Swiss employment by their student visas, Plaut and Koplowitz, along with Cunz, relied on writing as their primary source of income. Under the collective pen-name Stefan Brockhoff, they coauthored three highly successful detective novels that were published in Nazi Germany. Contemporaries of Friedrich Glauser, Plant et al. are recognized as pioneers of the specifically Swiss crime story genre (distinguished by setting and the occasional use of dialect). In addition, Plaut authored under his own name  a young readers’ book, Die Kiste mit dem großen S. (1936), which was published in Switzerland and also appeared in Dutch translation.  He wrote numerous film reviews for Basel's National-Zeitung, and using the pseudonym Richard Plant he even authored some articles published in newspapers in Nazi Germany.

Plaut and Koplowitz both completed the Ph.D. in German literature at Basel with dissertations written under the supervision first of Franz Zinkernagel and then, following his death in 1935, Eduard Hoffmann-Krayer. Koplowitz's 1936 dissertation analyzed the Naturalistic theater work of the leftist German Jewish director Otto Brahm, while Plaut's 1937 dissertation examined the sexually charged themes and psychological narrative style of the recently deceased Austrian Jewish physician and author Arthur Schnitzler. Following his dissertation, Plaut's next non-fiction book was a compact introduction to the cinema, including formal analysis as well as an international survey of films, entitled Taschenbuch des Films (1938), based on a course he taught at the Basel Volkshochschule. Since their student visas lapsed with the completion of the Ph.D. and they were not granted work permits or immigrant status, Plaut and Koplowitz found it increasingly untenable to remain in Switzerland. Together with Cunz, they decided to seek to emigrate to the U.S. This required mobilizing all available resources and connections, including affidavits of sponsorship by relatives in the U.S. and letters of recommendation written by Paul Tillich and Martin Sommerfeld, both recent emigres now teaching at U.S. universities.

Career in New York (1938–1973)

Following their 1938 arrival in New York, Plaut Americanized his name to Richard Rene Plant, and Koplowitz changed his name to Seidlin. They coauthored S.O.S. Geneva, an English-language young readers' book with a cosmopolitan and pacifistic theme published in October 1939, just before the outbreak of World War II. Through the Friendship House, Plant developed first contacts with native New Yorkers, and he also sought employment by networking within New York's burgeoning community of German emigres, some of whom communicated in the pages of the left-wing German Jewish weekly Aufbau. During 1941–42 he was employed by the recently arrived emigre Klaus Mann as an editorial assistant for the antifascist journal Decision, and he also worked for the recently arrived emigre Siegfried Kracauer. Following the American entry into World War II, Plant finally found full-time employment for three years as a propaganda scriptwriter, translator, and broadcaster for the U.S. Office of War Information and for NBC. He enjoyed life as a gay man during the war years, which brought a steady stream of unattached young men in uniform to New York. He was naturalized as a U.S. citizen on January 29, 1945.

Following the end of World War II, Plant and his friends went separate ways when Seidlin and Cunz held professorships in German studies in Massachusetts and Maryland, respectively, and later, together as a gay couple, at Ohio State University, where they rose to considerable prominence (in a signal honor, OSU's building for foreign languages and literatures was posthumously named after Cunz). Plant remained in New York, where in 1947 he was hired by the City College of the City University of New York. To complete work on his highly autobiographical novel The Dragon in the Forest (1948), Plant was awarded a Eugene F. Saxton Memorial Trust Fellowship, for which he was recommended by Norman Cousins. The book centers on a young man growing up in Frankfurt who is witness to the rise of the Nazis and whose best boyhood friend becomes a victim of Fritz Haarmann. Critical reception was mixed.

From time to time, Plant's book reviews of current German literature, including works by Heinrich Böll, Günter Grass, Marie Luise Kaschnitz, and Luise Rinser, were published in the New York Times, Saturday Review, The Nation, Esquire, and other periodicals. In 1957, he published a collection of short stories by Böll edited and annotated for use in German language instruction. In 1970, he coedited a second, more widely adopted reader for intermediate-level college instruction. Although he was successful enough as a classroom teacher to be granted tenure in 1957 and promotion to full professor in 1970, Plant struggled with condescending colleagues who disparaged his lack of scholarly publications while pooh-poohing his editorial and journalistic contributions. He resided in Greenwich Village, and summer holidays were spent with his friends Seidlin and Cunz in the mountains at Mallnitz, Austria, or on the beach at Manomet, Massachusetts, where they hobnobbed with the vacationing Hannah Arendt.

In 1956, Plant published (in English) an essay and the first of five short stories under the pseudonym Orlando Gibbons in the Swiss gay periodical Der Kreis. The essay commented on the anti-gay dimension of the McCarthy witch hunt of the preceding years, while the stories "are charming, happy-ending vignettes of gay life in New York City and Massachusetts, two of them with interesting black/white encounters. Especially touching is the story of a white boy who, despite his Southern upbringing, discovers that he can love a black man." The year 1965 saw the premiere of the opera Lizzie Borden, for which Plant had written the scenario. He regarded this as one of his foremost accomplishments.

The Pink Triangle

Following his retirement from university teaching in 1973, Plant was able to devote more time to his own interests, although he continued to offer occasional courses on German literature in translation at the New School for Social Research. Impressed by the formation of the Gay Academic Union and historical studies sparked by the gay liberation movement, he joined Senior Action in a Gay Environment and embarked upon his most ambitious writing project, a history of the persecution of gay men under the Nazi regime. As a gay man driven from Germany by the Nazis, he approached this topic as a matter of honor, and the book opens and closes with an autobiographical prologue and epilogue. In the course of his research, he traveled to Arolsen, Germany, to examine the concentration camp archives assembled there. His magnum opus, The Pink Triangle: The Nazi War Against Homosexuals, was published in 1986, and it was translated into German five years later, leading to a successful book tour in Germany. It has also been translated into Dutch (1987) and Slovenian (1991).

Plant's companion during his final years was Michael Sasse. Plant experienced major depression and was treated with electroshock therapy. He died in New York City on March 10, 1998. His papers are preserved in the Manuscripts and Archives Division of the New York Public Library.

Notes

References

External links
 1927 photo of Richard Plaut (center, at back in profile) with the Zionist youth group Kadimah
 Ca. 1935 photo of Richard Plaut (center) with Oskar Koplowitz (left) and Dieter Cunz (right) at the Gornergrat
 Photo of dust-jacket art of S.O.S. Geneva (1939) by William Pène du Bois 
 Photo ca. 1945
 Richard Plant papers at the New York Public Library
 Richard Plant in the IMDb
 I Have Two Faces (1998). Interview with Alexander Karp on DVD.

See also

History of gays in Nazi Germany and the Holocaust

1910 births
1998 deaths
20th-century American historians
20th-century American Jews
20th-century American male writers
20th-century German novelists
American male novelists
American male non-fiction writers
American political writers
City University of New York faculty
Gay academics
American gay writers
German gay writers
German children's writers
German crime fiction writers
German male novelists
Germanists
Historians of Germany
Historians of LGBT topics
Historians of Nazism
Historians of the Holocaust
Jewish American writers
Jewish emigrants from Nazi Germany to Switzerland
Jewish emigrants from Nazi Germany to the United States
Hessian emigrants to the United States
Jewish historians
LGBT historians
LGBT Jews
Novelists from New York (state)
People with acquired American citizenship
Emigrants from Nazi Germany to Switzerland
People with speech impediment
Persecution of homosexuals in Nazi Germany
The New School faculty
University of Basel alumni
People of the United States Office of War Information
Historians from New York (state)
Writers from Frankfurt